Florence Mills House is a house at 220 West 135th Street in Harlem, Manhattan, New York City. The house was originally believed to be the residence of Florence Mills, a leading African-American actress and entertainer during the 1920s. She lived at this address, or a similar address a few blocks away, during her most productive years from 1910 to 1927.  The 220 West 135th Street building that existed in 1927 no longer stands and has been replaced. The site was designated a National Historic Landmark in 1976.

The designation was withdrawn in January 2009. The actual address of her home was 220 West 133rd Street; the mistake was perpetuated because a photo of the house was mislabelled as being on West 135th Street in a New York Evening Journal article at the time of her death.  The 220 West 133rd Street building has also been demolished and replaced.  The mistake in landmarking the West 135th Street address is acknowledged implicitly by the National Park Service, in stating that "For a number of years, this four-story row house was thought to be Mills home for most of her tragically short life."

References

External links 

American Memory from the Library of Congress

Houses on the National Register of Historic Places in Manhattan
Former National Register of Historic Places in New York (state)
Former National Historic Landmarks of the United States
Former National Historic Landmarks in New York (state)